Polycarena is a genus of flowering plants belonging to the family Scrophulariaceae.

Its native range is Namibia and South African Republic.

Species:
 Polycarena aemulans Hilliard 
 Polycarena aurea Benth.

References

Scrophulariaceae
Scrophulariaceae genera